Kameron Langley (born April 13, 1999) is an American basketball player. He most recently played for the North Carolina A&T Aggies, where in his five-year career he became one of the most prolific assist leaders in NCAA Division I history.

Early life and high school career
Langley grew up in Greensboro, North Carolina and attended Southwest Guilford High School where he was coached by Guy Shavers. Langley was named the Piedmont Triad Conference Player of the year as a sophomore and as a junior, when he averaged 15.6 points, 6.8 rebounds, 5.9 assists and 3.2 steals per game. Langley led the school to a 27–3 record and the regular season conference title. As a senior, he led the Cowboys to the 4A State Championship and was named the MVP of the state championship game against Leesville Road High School.

College career
Langley became the Aggies' starting point guard as a true freshman and was named to the MEAC All-Freshman team after averaging 7.4 points, 3.3 rebounds and 5.1 assists per game and leading the conference with 59 steals. He averaged 7.1 points, a conference-leading 6.5 assists, 3.5 rebounds and 1.5 steals per game during his sophomore season. Langley broke North Carolina A&T's career assists record during a 10 point, 13 assist and eight rebound performance in an 83–62 win over Maryland Eastern Shore on February 25, 2020, passing the previous record of 582 held by Thomas Griffis. Langley set a MEAC men's basketball tournament tournament record with 15 assists while also setting the conference record of career assists in a quarterfinal win over Howard during the 2020 MEAC men's basketball tournament. Langley was named first team All-MEAC while leading the nation in total assists and assists per game. Langley averaged 9.4 points, 8 assists, and 5.2 rebounds per game. Following the season, he declared for the 2020 NBA draft. Langley withdrew from the draft on June 9. As a senior, he averaged 10.6 points, 6.6 assists, 5 rebounds and 2.7 steals per game, earning Second Team All-MEAC honors. Langley declared for the 2021 NBA draft, before withdrawing and taking advantage of the NCAA's granting of a fifth season of eligibility.

Career statistics

College

|-
| style="text-align:left;"| 2017–18
| style="text-align:left;"| North Carolina A&T
| 35 || 33 || 30.5 || .515 || .357 || .711 || 3.3 || 5.1 || 1.7 || .1 || 7.4
|-
| style="text-align:left;"| 2018–19
| style="text-align:left;"| North Carolina A&T
| 32|| 29 || 27.7 || .456 || .280 || .562 || 3.5 || 6.5 || 1.5 || .1 || 7.1
|-
| style="text-align:left;"| 2019–20
| style="text-align:left;"| North Carolina A&T
| 31 || 31 || 32.6 || .441 || .176 || .520 || 5.2 ||style="background:#cfecec;" | 8.0* || 2.1 || .1 || 9.4
|-
| style="text-align:left;"| 2020–21
| style="text-align:left;"| North Carolina A&T
| 19 || 19 || 31.2 || .425 || .400 || .640 || 5.0 || 6.6 || 2.7 || .1 || 10.6
|-
| style="text-align:left;"| 2021–22
| style="text-align:left;"| North Carolina A&T
| 31 || 23 || 27.1 || .407 || .263 || .608 || 3.3 || 4.7 || 1.7 || .1 || 6.3
|- class="sortbottom"
| style="text-align:center;" colspan="2"| Career
| 148 || 135 || 29.7 || .449 || .306 || .595 || 3.9 || 6.1 || 1.9 || .1 || 7.9

Personal life
Langley has three brothers, all of whom have played college basketball in the Greensboro area. His older brother KJ was the starting point guard for Greensboro College and he has two younger twin brothers, Keyshaun and Kobe, who originally committed to play together at Virginia Tech before de-committing and choosing to play at UNC Greensboro.

See also
 List of NCAA Division I men's basketball season assists leaders
 List of NCAA Division I men's basketball career assists leaders

References

External links
North Carolina A&T Aggies bio

1999 births
Living people
21st-century African-American sportspeople
African-American basketball players
American men's basketball players
Basketball players from Greensboro, North Carolina
North Carolina A&T Aggies men's basketball players
Point guards